Anthony James Douglas (born 22 November 1985, in Nottingham) is a British former short track speed skater who competed at the 2010 Winter Olympics. Douglas was a member of the British team that finished sixth in the 5000 meter relay.

Achievements 

 2008 ISU World Cup – Vancouver, British Columbia, Canada
  – Men's 5000m relay
 2008 ISU European Championships – Ventspils, Latvia
  – Men's 5000m relay
 2010 ISU European Championships – Dresden, Germany
  – Men's 5000m relay
 2011 ISU European Championships – Heerenveen, Netherlands
  – Men's 5000m relay
 Former British national record holder – 1500m and 5000m relay

References

External links
 
 
 

1985 births
Living people
British male short track speed skaters
Olympic short track speed skaters of Great Britain
Short track speed skaters at the 2010 Winter Olympics
People educated at Nottingham High School
Sportspeople from Nottingham